Macdunnoughia is a genus of moths of the family Noctuidae.

Species
Subgenus Macdunnoughia
 Macdunnoughia confusa – Dewick's Plusia Stephens, 1850
 Macdunnoughia crassisigna Warren, 1913
 Macdunnoughia hybrida Ronkay, 1986
Subgenus Puriplusia Chou & Lu, 1974
 Macdunnoughia purissima Butler, 1878
 Macdunnoughia tetragona Walker, [1858]

References
 Macdunnoughia at funet.fi
 Natural History Museum Lepidoptera genus database

Plusiini